Albert Pryce-Jones  ( – 17 August 1946) was a Welsh international footballer.

Pryce-Jones was born in Newtown, Montgomeryshire, Wales in 1870. He was the son of Sir Pryce Pryce-Jones, a former Conservative member of the British House of Commons.

He was part of the Wales national football team, playing 1 match on 18 March 1895 against England.

In 1895 he played for Newtown in their Welsh Cup victory. He appeared alongside his brother William Pryce-Jones who was also an international footballer for Wales.

He emigrated to Calgary, Canada in 1910 where he established the department store Pryce-Jones Ltd.

He served in the Canadian infantry in World War I. He died in August 1946 aged 76.

See also
 List of Wales international footballers (alphabetical)

References

1870 births
Welsh footballers
Wales international footballers
Place of birth missing
Year of death missing
Association footballers not categorized by position
Canadian Expeditionary Force officers